Eupithecia improvisa is a moth in the family Geometridae. It is found in Pakistan.

References

Moths described in 2012
improvisa
Moths of Asia